Zyon Gilbert (born February 4, 1999) is an American football cornerback for the New York Giants of the National Football League (NFL).

Early life and education
Gilbert was born on February 4, 1999, in Montgomery, Alabama. He attended Jefferson Davis High School there and was a two-way player in football, earning twice all-state honors. He was named the school's best defensive back, best two-way player, and was given the "speed award" at a season-ending banquet. Gilbert was a three-star recruit and committed to Florida Atlantic.

Gilbert became the starter as a true freshman in 2017 and recorded 52 total tackles in 14 games. He remained a starter in 2018 and recorded 51 tackles in 12 matches. In 2019, Gilbert recorded 48 tackles, 10 passes defended, two interceptions and a forced fumble on his way to being named honorable mention all-conference.

As a senior in 2020, Gilbert tallied 46 tackles, one interception and six passes defended, being named honorable mention all-conference for the second consecutive season. After being given an extra year of eligibility due to the COVID-19 pandemic, he opted to return to the team in 2021 for a final season. That year, Gilbert appeared in 12 games and finished with 51 tackles, two interceptions and 12 passes defended, as well as a third honorable mention all-conference selection. He finished his time at Florida Atlantic as the school's all-time leader in games played with 57, and recorded 248 tackles, 31 passes defended and five interceptions.

Professional career
After going unselected in the 2022 NFL Draft, Gilbert was signed by the New York Giants as an undrafted free agent. He was released at the final roster cuts but was subsequently re-signed to the practice squad. Gilbert was elevated to the active roster for their week thirteen game with the Washington Commanders, and started at cornerback in his NFL debut, appearing on 62 snaps and recording seven tackles. He posted his first career sack the following week against the Philadelphia Eagles. He signed a reserve/future contract on January 22, 2023.

References

External links
New York Giants bio
Florida Atlantic Owls bio

1999 births
Living people
American football cornerbacks
Players of American football from Montgomery, Alabama
Florida Atlantic Owls football players
New York Giants players